Kara Moana Healey (23 June 1904 – 10 June 2006) was a field collector, conservationist, preservationist and naturalist and the first female National Park Ranger in Victoria, Australia.

Born Kara Moana Elizabeth Vernon in Kawhia, New Zealand. The name Karamoana is said to be Maori, meaning "Rippling waters"  and Kara was given this name in honour of her Maori nurse.

Kara's family (William John Vernon and Mary Vernon née Dunstone) were Australian and had moved to New Zealand for a few years for work. Her father was a blacksmith, however was in New Zealand working for the Timber industry installing boilers to power saw mills.  Two years after Kara's birth the family returned to  Australia (1906) and settled in Mysia, north west of Bendigo.

Early life
Kara was awarded a scholarship to attend Bendigo High School. After finishing school Kara became a teacher's assistant at Stuart Mill State School near St Arnaud, Victoria until she met and married William Stanley McGreevy (known as Stan) in 1925. Stan joined the army at the outbreak of World War 2. Stan served four years in the army and saw action in the Middle East. Stan was affected by his war experiences and declining health, Stan returned to Melbourne and the couple divorced in 1946.

Kara sought work at the Yarram Hospital as a cook.  After some time Kara met Jim Healey, the caretaker at Tarra Valley National Park. Kara and Jim Healey married in 1948. Jim Healey died in 1952

Tarra-Bulga National Park
Kara applied and was successfully appointed the Park Ranger at Tarra-Bulga National Park. Kara responded to a call from the CSIRO to collect specimens for identification for the National Herbarium.

Over ten years Kara collected specimens. Kara became one with the natural environment around her. By 1961 Kara had collected over 160 specimens which included types of toadstool and fungi. Significantly, two new types of fungi were named after her – Poria healeyi and Lambertella healeyi. Poria healeyi, which was a  previously unidentified fungus causing yellow straw rot in Mountain Ash, and the second, Lambertella healeyi was a fungus growing on another fungus. Further, Kara collected animal and insect specimens using dead animals that she found and forwarded those as well. In total over 500 specimens were collected which also included 80 species of moss. Subsequently Tarra Valley is the most thoroughly studied and recorded area in Australia at the time.

Scientific contribution
Neville Walters, a scientist at the CSIRO, described Kara's contribution as "easily the best" of the 150 or more collectors Australia wide, and further commented "She knew every lyrebird in the park as well as many of the pilot birds, Crimson Rosellas and yellow robins. She wasn't afraid of the snakes, insects and numerous mammals - nor were they frightened of her." Kara also contributed specimens to the National Museum of Victoria, the University of Melbourne and the National Herbarium. Kara became quite a celebrity through newspaper articles about her and her work, and she was acquainted with many of the leading naturalists of the day.

Walters and a colleague visited Mrs Healey, as she was known,  had vivid memories of her little cottage.  The scientists and Kara had endless conversations regarding the natural flora and fauna of the area and Kara showed the scientists examples of where specimens were collected.

Kara observed and noted the activities of the birds and animals within the park. Particularly the mating habits of the Lyrebird where the male lyre bird constructs mounds by scratching the earth,  sticks and other debris into areas where he then performs his dance with his magnificent tail feathers on display to attract a female.

Kara did pastel paintings and sketched all the specimens, animals and birds within the park.  Photography was also used in latter years to record the specimens in their natural state. Kara had the films made into "slides" which was state of the art at the time. All of Kara's specimens and photographic libraries were handed over to Parks Victoria who have since restored, converted to digital and archived all salvageable items.

At times Kara's house was an animal hospital as she rescued orphaned wombats,  possums, birds  and other animals, which were returned to the wild when they recovered or grew old enough to fend for themselves.

Her duties at the Park included sweeping the tracks daily as the animals and birds plus the natural fall a debris covered the tracks. Visitors were greeted and the parking fee collected.

As word spread in the naturalist world car loads and bus loads of people came to the park. Kara delivered a nature talk describing the plants and animals within the park. Occasionally she would summon a wild bird from high up in the tree to fly to her hand to collect a reward.

Retirement and life final stages
In 1963, Kara married Tom McKean,  a widower. They made residence Yarram. Kara continued her contact with an active role with the Red Cross, the Yarram Hospital and the Save the Children's fund. Tom McKean died in 1986.

In 1995 Kara became a resident of the Heytesbury Lodge nursing home at Cobden which was close to other members of the family.

Kara was awarded a certificate of merit for outstanding support by the Save the Children Australia. Her daughters attended with her in a special ceremony held in Melbourne 30/11/1995. Kara was always keen to raise money for and support charities that helped the less fortunate such as Save the Children Fund, the Red Cross and The Yarram Hospital .

Milestone birthdays were celebrated with her family,  including her 100th birthday, at Timboon, which was attended by over 100 friends and family.

Kara died 13 days short of her 102nd birthday. A service was held in Yarram attended by hundreds of people including members from Parks Victoria including Craig Campbell, the current Ranger at Tarra Valley, who spoke to the congregation.

Commemoration at the centenary of Tarra-Bulga National Park

In 2007 a special ceremony was held at Tarra Valley Park,  now part of Tarra-Bulga National Park, as part of the centennial celebrations, to unveil a special tribute to the first woman park ranger and the contribution she made to the understanding of the ecology of the valley known as Tarra Valley.

Notes

 Newspaper article:- Sunday Pioneer, Lucknow. India. Article - Mistress of the Lyrebird.13 September 1953. written by John Loughlin. Courtesy- Australian High Commissioners Office. New Delhi
 Newspaper Article:- The Sun - (Now The Herald Sun.) Melbourne. Victoria. Article:- A LyreBird Looks in at her Window. Written by John Fitzgerald Date yet to be verified.
 Publication - Book:- Discover Historic Gippsland. Written by Mary Ryllis Clark
 Alberton Shire Council Meeting transcript:- Councillor The Honorable R W May. Informing Council of the acquisition of Mrs Healey Property at Tarra Valley to be added to The Tarra Valley National Park.
 The word "Moana" means Sea, ocean or large Lake in the Maori language, however a direct translation of Kara Moana is not available and maybe a localised term (dialect) or an English adaptation. (see Maori Dictionary http://www.maoridictionary.co.nz/search?idiom=&phrase=&proverb=&loan=&keywords=moana&search= )
 It is believed that William Vernon was contracted to build a boiler to power a saw mill, however no documentation has been found to substantiate.
 Shipping records substantiate these movements. Documents held by Dawn Reddick, Kara's daughter and amateur Genealogist
 Further information:- When the family settled in Mysia approx 1906. William Vernon, a blacksmith, built a mudbrick residence with a blacksmiths shop attached. This dwelling is now standing as at 2015. Accurate story and relative documents held by Dawn Reddick, Kara's daughter and amateur Genealogist
 The accuracy of the story depicted in the Wikipedia page have been verified with Dawn Reddick, Kara's daughter and amateur Genealogist who holds the various documents in support of births, deaths, marriages, divorce, ship records published in this article.
 This article consists of extracts from published newspaper articles listed above.
 Photos Supplied by Stephen Reddick, Kara's Grandson. Original Photo of Kara held by Dawn Reddick who authorised use for this Wikipedia page. Photo of Plaque taken and supplied by Stephen Reddick
 This Wikipedia Article Written by Stephen Reddick and Dawn Reddick.

References

External links
Friends of Tarra-Bulga National Park website

 Tarra Valley Rainforest Walk
 Fern Gully Nature Walk
 Gippsland’s official tourism website – Tarra Bulga National Park

Australian conservationists
1904 births
2006 deaths
-
Gippsland (region)